Karolina Goliat (born 25 October 1996) is a Belgian female volleyball player. She is a member of the Belgium women's national volleyball team.

She was part of the Belgian national team at the 2015 FIVB World Grand Prix,

She is of Polish descent. Her father Wiesław Goliat was a Polish national handball team player, her mother Jadwiga Wojciechowska was a Polish national volleyball team player.

Clubs

References

External links 
 
 
 
 

1995 births
Living people
Belgian women's volleyball players
Belgian people of Polish descent
Sportspeople from Sint-Niklaas
21st-century Belgian women